The Snow Fountain and Clock is a historic public monument at the southern junction of  North Main and East Main Streets in Brockton, Massachusetts, USA.  The monument was given to the city in 1902 by George C. Snow, who lived in a large house near the site.  The monument has three major components: a water fountain, a horse trough, and a four-faced clock mounted on a  column in the center of the water fountain.  The trough and fountain are constructed of Quincy granite.  The clock mechanism was constructed by E. Howard & Co.  The horse trough is now used as a planter.

The monument was listed on the National Register of Historic Places in 1977.

See also
National Register of Historic Places listings in Plymouth County, Massachusetts

References

Monuments and memorials on the National Register of Historic Places in Massachusetts
Buildings and structures in Brockton, Massachusetts
National Register of Historic Places in Plymouth County, Massachusetts
Fountains in Massachusetts
Clocks in the United States